The 2008–09 Kansas State Wildcats men's basketball team represented Kansas State University in the 2008–09 college basketball season. The Wildcats, led by second-year head coach Frank Martin, played their home games at Bramlage Coliseum.

Pre-season
The 2007–08 season was a successful one for the Wildcats. They returned to the NCAA tournament for the first time since 1996. 2007–08 was also the first season for head coach Frank Martin. Michael Beasley and Bill Walker led the team in scoring and nearly every other offensive category. They were also both drafted, marking the first time since 1990 that a Wildcat was drafted (Steve Henson was the last). It was also the first time since 1982 that more than one Wildcat was drafted (Tyrone Adams, Randy Reed and Ed Nealy.

Regular season
Kansas State became just the second school in Big 12 history (after Iowa State in 2004–05) to rally from an 0–4 start to get back to at least .500 in conference play. The previous best finish after such a start came in 1983–84 when K-State finished Big Eight play with a 5–9 mark.

The Wildcats finished the conference season in a tie for fourth place with a 9–7 record in the Big 12 and a 21–10 record overall. They earned the number four seed in the 2009 Big 12 men's basketball tournament. 2008–09 marks the third consecutive year that the team earned one of the top 4 spots in the tournament, and thus received a first round bye.

Incoming signees

Schedule

|-
!colspan=9| Exhibition

|-
!colspan=9| Regular season

|- 

|-
!colspan=9| Phillips 66 Big 12 tournament

|-
!colspan=9| 2009 NIT tournament

Roster

Statistics

Season Box Score

See also
2008–09 Big 12 Conference men's basketball season

References

Kansas State
Kansas State Wildcats men's basketball seasons
Kansas State
Kansas State Wildcats men's basketball
Kansas State Wildcats men's basketball